Fighter Squadron 11 or VF-11 was an aviation unit of the United States Navy. It was originally established as VF-5 on 1 February 1927, redesignated as VF-5S on 1 July 1927, redesignated as VF-5B in January 1928, redesignated VB-1B on 1 July 1928, redesignated VF-5B on 1 July 1930, redesignated VF-5S in July 1932, redesignated VF-5B in April 1933, redesignated VF-4 on 1 July 1937, redesignated VF-41 on 15 March 1941, redesignated VF-4 on 4 August 1943, redesignated VF-1A on 15 November 1946, redesignated VF-11 on 2 August 1948 and disestablished on 15 February 1959. It was the second US Navy squadron to be designated VF-11.

Operational history

1920s-30s

VF-5 was established on 1 February 1927 at Hampton Roads, Virginia flying the Curtis F6C-3 Hawk.  From 1927 to World War II, the squadron flew various aircraft including the Boeing F3B-1 and F4B-1, the Grumman FF-1 and F3F-1 and also held the following designations (designations tended to change based on the mission; e.g., "S" for scout, "B" for bomber): VF-5S, VF-5B, VB-1B, and VF-4.

1940s

During World War II, VF-41 deployed on  supported the Allied invasion of Northwest Africa, downing 14 Vichy French aircraft in the Grumman F4F-3 Wildcat on 8/9 November 1942. The squadron lost 7 F4Fs in action over the same period. In October and November 1943 while operating from USS Ranger, VF-41 attacked targets in German-occupied Norway.

The squadron transferred to the Pacific Theatre. VF-4 deployed aboard  losing 5 F6Fs in operations off the Philippines in November 1944. VF-4 deployed aboard  and participated in the Battle of Mindoro, attacks on Japanese bases on Formosa and the Battle of Okinawa, losing 28 F6Fs between November 1944 and March 1945. For the fighter-bomber mission the Hellcat was fitted with wingroot pylons, each of which could carry a 1,000 -Ib bomb or a 'Tiny Tim' rocket. Smaller rockets were carried on three zero-length launchers on each wing.

1950s

During this deployment VF-11 lost 2 F2H-2s and their pilots to enemy fire.

VF-11 was assigned to Carrier Air Group 10 (CVG-10) aboard  for a Mediterranean from 13 August 1956 to 11 February 1957.

VF-11 operating the F2H-4 was assigned to Air Task Group 201 (ATG-201) aboard  for a deployment to the Mediterranean, the Indian Ocean and the Western Pacific from 2 February to 17 November 1958. In the Mediterranean, USS Essex supported the US Marines landed in Lebanon.

In 1959, VF-11 moved to NAS Jacksonville and was disestablished on 15 February 1959, their men and equipment being distributed to other squadrons and activities. The 3rd VF-11, redesignated from VF-43 on 16 February 1959 adopted the insignia and nickname of the disestablished second VF-11.

Home port assignments
Hampton Roads
NAS Jacksonville

Aircraft assignment
F6C-3 Hawk
F3B-1
F4B-1
FF-1
F3F-1
F4F-3 Wildcat
F6F Hellcat
F8F Bearcat
F2H-2/4 Banshee
F3D-2 Skynight

See also
VFA-11
History of the United States Navy
List of inactive United States Navy aircraft squadrons
List of United States Navy aircraft squadrons

References

External links

Strike fighter squadrons of the United States Navy